The 21st Lancers (Empress of India's) was a cavalry regiment of the British Army, raised in 1858 and amalgamated with the 17th Lancers in 1922 to form the 17th/21st Lancers. Perhaps its most famous engagement was the Battle of Omdurman, where Winston Churchill (then an officer of the 4th Hussars), rode with the unit.

History

Formation
The regiment was originally raised in Bengal by the East India Company in 1858 as the 3rd Bengal European Light Cavalry, for service in the Indian Rebellion.  As with all other "European" units of the Company, it was placed under the command of the British Crown in 1858, and formally moved into the British Army in 1862, when it was designated as a hussar regiment and titled the 21st Regiment of Hussars. A detachment saw service in the 1884–5 expedition to the Sudan, with the Light Camel Regiment. In 1897 it was re-designated as a lancer regiment, becoming the 21st Lancers. The Indian origin of the regiment was commemorated in its "French grey" facings - this distinctive light blue/grey shade having previously been the uniform colour of the East India Company's eight regiments of Bengal Native Cavalry.

Mahdist War

In 1898 the regiment served in Sudan during the Mahdist War, as the only British cavalry unit involved. It was there that the full regiment charged with lances in the classic cavalry style during the Battle of Omdurman in September 1898. Of less than 400 men involved in the charge 70 were killed and wounded and the regiment won three Victoria Crosses. These three were Private Thomas Byrne, Lieutenant Raymond de Montmorency and Captain Paul Kenna. This spectacular encounter earned considerable public attention and praise for the regiment, though it was also criticized as a costly and unnecessary anachronism - since the 2,000 Dervish spearmen dispersed by the 21st Lancers could have been destroyed by rifle fire with few if any British losses. Winston Churchill (then an officer of the 4th Hussars), rode with the unit.

"Omdurman" was the regiment's only battle honour, giving rise to the satirical regimental motto of "thou shalt not kill." That same year, the regiment was given the title 21st (Empress of India's) Lancers, taking the name from Queen Victoria who was the Empress of India.

Service in Ireland and India

The regiment was moved to Dublin in 1899, and served in Ireland for several years. In 1912 it was again posted to India. The 21st Lancers did not see service on the Western Front during the First World War, being the only regular cavalry regiment of the British Army to spend the duration of the war in India. The regiment did however see action on the North-West Frontier during 1915–16, with one trooper, Charles Hull, receiving the Victoria Cross. A single squadron made up of reservists served in France in 1916–17, attached to XIV Corps.

Disbandment
The regiment was retitled 21st Lancers (Empress of India's) in 1921 and shortly thereafter disbanded as part of the post-War reduction in forces, though a cadre was briefly resurrected in 1922 in order to amalgamate with the 17th Lancers, to form the 17th/21st Lancers.

Regimental museum
The regimental collection is held at The Royal Lancers and Nottinghamshire Yeomanry Museum which is based at Thoresby Hall in Nottinghamshire.

Victoria Crosses
John Berryman, Sergeant - Crimean War, 25 October 1854
John Farrell, Sergeant - Crimean War, 25 October 1854
Thomas Byrne, Private - Sudan Campaign, 2 September 1898
Raymond de Montmorency, Lieutenant - Sudan Campaign, 2 September 1898
Paul Aloysius Kenna, Captain - Sudan Campaign, 2 September 1898
Charles Hull, Private - First World War, 5 September 1915

Regimental Colonels
Colonels of the regiment were:
3rd Bengal European Light Cavalry
1858–1862: Lt-Gen. William Pattle, CB
21st Regiment of Hussars (1852)
Transferred to British Army, 1852
1862–1865: Lt-Gen. Sir John Bennett Hearsey, KCB
1865–1880: Gen. William Parlby
21st Hussars (1877)
1880–1882: Gen. Hon. James William Bosville Macdonald, CB
1882–1886: Gen. Sir Charles John Foster, KCB
1886–1902: Gen. Sir Robert White, KCB
21st (Empress of India's) Lancers (1898)
1902–1909: Maj-Gen. Sir Alexander James Hardy Elliot, KCB
1909–1916: Maj-Gen. Sir Frederick William Benson, KCB
1916–1919: Maj-Gen. Arthur Henry Taylor
1919–1921: Gen. Hon. Sir Herbert Alexander Lawrence, GCB (to 17th/21st Lancers)
1921: Disbanded
1922: Reformed and amalgamated with 17th Lancers (Duke of Cambridge's Own) to form the 17th/21st Lancers

See also
British cavalry during the First World War
21st Light Dragoons
White mutiny

References

Sources

Further reading
 
 

Cavalry regiments of the British Army
Military units and formations established in 1858
L21
Military units and formations disestablished in 1922
1858 establishments in India